Conringia orientalis is a species of flowering plant in the mustard family known by the common name hare's ear mustard. It is native to Eurasia but it is known elsewhere as an introduced species and sometimes a noxious weed. It is weedy in its native range and also in North America, where it is a widespread invasive species, especially in central Canada.

It is an annual herb producing an unbranched erect stem  in height. The plant is known to be toxic to livestock.

References

External links
Jepson Manual Treatment

Brassicaceae
Flora of Malta